Hardin County is the name of six counties in the United States of America:

Hardin County, Illinois
Hardin County, Iowa
Hardin County, Kentucky
Hardin County, Ohio
Hardin County, Tennessee
Hardin County, Texas

See also
Harden County, New South Wales, Australia